Andrei Xepkin Xepkina (born 1 May 1965 in Zaporizhzhia, Ukraine) is a Spanish and former Ukrainian handball player who competed in the 2000 Summer Olympics for Spain. He became Spanish citizen in 1998.

In 2000 he won the bronze medal with the Spanish team. He played all eight matches and scored 21 goals.

References
 

1965 births
Living people
Ukrainian male handball players
Spanish male handball players
Liga ASOBAL players
FC Barcelona Handbol players
Ukrainian emigrants to Spain
Naturalised citizens of Spain
Olympic handball players of Spain
Handball players at the 2000 Summer Olympics
Olympic bronze medalists for Spain
Olympic medalists in handball
Medalists at the 2000 Summer Olympics
Sportspeople from Zaporizhzhia